"Just Got Started Lovin' You" is a song co-written and recorded by American country music artist James Otto.  It was released in July 2007 as the first single from his album Sunset Man.  On the Hot Country Songs chart dated for May 17, 2008, the song has also become Otto's first (and to date, his only) number-one hit. The song was also the number one song on Billboard's year-end 2008 Hot Country Songs chart.

Background and writing
Otto had placed a telephone call to his friend, songwriter Jim Femino, when Femino and D. Vincent Williams were shopping at a grocery store in Nashville, Tennessee. Otto had wanted to write a song with Femino, and Femino suggested bringing Williams (who had never met Otto before) with him.

When they met Otto at Williams' house, Williams stated that he noticed a sex appeal in Otto's material, comparing the singer to Conway Twitty. Williams then came up with a melody that he "thought was cool", and put down the melody on his computer; after Otto heard the tune, he felt that it "suggested a sexy lyric and came from a sexy spot", and eventually came up with the title "Just Got Started Lovin' You". The three then recorded a work tape and played it for singer and producer John Rich (of Big & Rich), who chose it as the first single from Otto's Sunset Man album.

The song is in the key of G major with a tempo of approximately 92 beats per minute and a 4/4 time signature. Its verses follow the chord pattern G-Am7-C-D-G.

Critical reception
Kevin John Coyne of Country Universe gave the song a B grade, calling it "a smooth but not sappy romantic ballad." He also said that he isn't "reinventing the wheel, but he sounds comfortable and self-assured."

Music video
The music video was directed by Ryan Smith and was filmed on November 26, 2007.

Chart performance

Year-end charts

References

External links
Music video at CMT.com

2007 singles
2007 songs
James Otto songs
Billboard Hot Country Songs number-one singles of the year
Songs written by James Otto
Songs written by D. Vincent Williams
Song recordings produced by John Rich
Warner Records Nashville singles